Sanpitch may refer to:

Places
 San Pitch River, a river in Sanpete County, Utah
 Sanpete County, Utah, US
 Sanpete Valley or Valley of the Sanpitch or Sanpitch Valley, Utah, US
 San Pitch Mountains, a mountain range that runs along the west side of Sanpete County, Utah, US

People
 San Pitch Utes, an American Indian tribe who lived in the Sanpete Valley
 Sanpitch (Ute chief) (killed 1866), chief of the Sanpits tribe who lived in the Sanpete Valley, Utah, US
 Sanpitch (Shoshone chief) (alive in 1870), associated with the Bear River Massacre, Idaho, US

See also
 Sampit, a town on the Sampit River, Borneo, Indonesia